The Swan 391 was designed by Ron Holland and built by Nautor's Swan and first launched in 1981.

External links
 Nautor Swan

References

Sailing yachts
Keelboats
1980s sailboat type designs
Sailboat types built by Nautor Swan
Sailboat type designs by Ron Holland